is a side-scrolling action game by Sega released for the Game Gear in 1992. It is the sequel to The G.G. Shinobi, an offshoot of the Shinobi series created for Sega's portable platform. The player controls Joe Musashi as he rendezvous with his ninja allies from the previous game, giving the player access to different characters with unique abilities as the game progresses.

Plot
The evil Techno-Warriors have enlisted the Black Ninja, master of ninja techniques, to help them take over Neo City. This evil syndicate has captured the four elemental crystals and their guardian ninja. Joe Musashi has to rescue the four fellow ninja and retrieve their corresponding Elemental Crystals, before the final showdown against the evil Black Ninja in his castle.

Gameplay
The player begins the game as Joe Musashi (the Red Ninja), whose mission is to retrieve five elemental crystals that were stolen by the enemy and spread across different locations. Similarly to the original G.G. Shinobi, the first four stages can be played in any order and after defeating the boss of each stage, Musashi will be joined by one of his allies, allowing the player to control them as well. Some of the ninjas' abilities are different from those in the previous game. Depending on the stage, the player must use a specific ninja's ability in order to reach the location of the crystal. As a result, some of the stages must be played more than once if the player does not have the necessary character yet. When the first four crystals are all gathered, the player gains access to the enemy's main base, where the fifth crystal is being held by the final boss.

Each ninja has a particular skill set that includes a unique weapon, special ability, and ninja magic. Each of these skills can be used to destroy enemies, access secret areas, and obtain hidden health power-ups.

Reception
The G.G. Shinobi II: The Silent Fury was very well received by game critics. Power Unlimited gave the game a score of 82% writing: "Shinobi II: The Silent Fury is ideally suited for the Game Gear. The image is clear, the game is challenging, and you can continue playing later through a password system. It is a pity that your only movements are jumping and chopping." In 2011, Complex.com ranked it as the 18th greatest handheld game of all time, adding "it was definitely one of the reasons we were Sega fanboys/fangirls back in the day. Why get a Game Boy when you could get THIS?" Retro Gamer included this "more balanced" sequel to the first G.G. Shinobi on their list of top ten Game Gear games for its "far tighter level design, faster flowing action and greatly improved gameplay mechanics".

References 

Sega Visions, November–December 1992, p. 72.

External links

Shinobi II: The Silent Fury at GameFAQs

1992 video games
Platform games
Game Gear games
Game Gear-only games
Sega video games
Shinobi (series)
Side-scrolling video games
Single-player video games
Video games scored by Motohiro Kawashima
Video games scored by Yuzo Koshiro
Video games developed in Japan